The Rexburg Idaho Temple is the 125th operating temple of the Church of Jesus Christ of Latter-day Saints (LDS Church).

History
Announced in late 2003, the temple was dedicated on February 10, 2008 and was the first temple dedicated by Thomas S. Monson as the church's new president. The Rexburg Idaho Temple was the third LDS temple in Idaho. (Later in 2008, a fourth Idaho temple was dedicated in Twin Falls.)  The temple sits south of the Brigham Young University–Idaho (BYU–Idaho) campus on the south side of Rexburg. Prior to its completion, BYU–Idaho had been the only LDS Church-owned university without a temple adjacent to its campus.

The designing of this temple differs from others in that it was designed by a private firm, not the church's architectural department. This was done because the church wished it to have a fresh new look. The temple has two progressive endowment and five sealing rooms.

On August 30, 2007, it was announced that the temple's open house would begin on December 29, 2007 and run through January 26, 2008. The dedication was to be held on February 3, 2008; however, due to the death of Gordon B. Hinckley and his funeral planned for February 2, 2008, the dedication was postponed one week and was dedicated on February 10 by Monson, the new church president. Val R. Christensen was the temple's first president.

The temple rests atop a hill, as does much of the city with a shield volcano nearby.

In 2020, the Rexburg Idaho Temple was closed in response to the coronavirus pandemic.

See also

 Comparison of temples of The Church of Jesus Christ of Latter-day Saints
 List of temples of The Church of Jesus Christ of Latter-day Saints
 List of temples of The Church of Jesus Christ of Latter-day Saints by geographic region
 The Church of Jesus Christ of Latter-day Saints in Idaho

References

External links
 
 Rexburg Idaho Temple (official)
 Rexburg Idaho Temple at ChurchofJesusChristTemples.org
 Rexburg Temple Webcamera at byui.edu

21st-century Latter Day Saint temples
Buildings and structures in Madison County, Idaho
Religious buildings and structures completed in 2008
Temples (LDS Church) in Idaho
Temples (LDS Church) in the United States
2008 establishments in Idaho